The 2014 Derry Senior Hurling Championship was the 68th staging of the Derry Senior Hurling Championship since its establishment by the Derry County Board in 1887. The championship began on 23 July 2014 and ended on 28 September 2014.

Slaughtneil were the defending champions, and successfully retained the title following a 2-11 to 2-9 defeat of Kevin Lynch's Hurling Club.

Results

Quarter-finals

Semi-finals

Final

References

External links
 2014 McGurk Chartered Architects Senior Hurling Championship

Derry Senior Hurling Championship
Derry Senior Hurling Championship